Chief Atahm School is an immersion school working to revive the Secwepemc language. It is located on the Adams Lake reserve near the town of Chase, British Columbia. The school is operated by parents.

References

External links 
Chief Atahm School

Secwepemc
First Nations education
First Nations organizations in British Columbia